Giancarlo Chiono (26 August 1936 – 25 July 1974) was an Italian sports shooter. He competed in the skeet event at the 1968 Summer Olympics.

References

External links
 

1936 births
1974 deaths
Italian male sport shooters
Olympic shooters of Italy
Shooters at the 1968 Summer Olympics
Sportspeople from Turin